Anadia ocellata, commonly known as the ocellated anadia , is a species of lizard endemic to the Americas.

Description
A. ocellata is a small and slender lizard. Its body is cylindrical with a long tail that is very sensitive and quickly subject to autotomy when in danger or when manipulated inadequately.

Geographic range
A. ocellata is distributed from Costa Rica to Ecuador.

Habitat and behavior
A. ocellata is rather unusual for a lizard in that it has frequently been found in, or close to, bromeliads. Thus its habits are considered arboreal, which would account for its scarceness.

References

Further reading
Boulenger GA. 1885. Catalogue of the Lizards in the British Museum (Natural History). Second Edition. ... Teiidæ ... London: Trustees of the British Museum (Natural History). (Taylor and Francis, printers). xiii + 497 pp. + Plates I-XXIV. (Anadia ocellata, pp. 398–399, description of holotype; and A. metallica, p. 400).
Gray JE. 1845. Catalogue of the Specimens of Lizards in the Collection of the British Museum. London: Trustees of the British Museum. (Edward Newman, printer). xxviii + 289 pp. (Anadia ocellata, new species, p. 58).

Anadia (genus)
Reptiles of Colombia
Reptiles of Costa Rica
Reptiles of Ecuador
Reptiles of Panama
Reptiles described in 1845
Taxa named by John Edward Gray